The 2019–20 Deportivo Alavés season was the club's 108th season in existence and the club's 15th season in the top flight of Spanish football. It covered a period from 1 July 2019 to 19 July 2020. Alavés competed in La Liga and Copa del Rey.

Players

Squad information

Out of first team

Out on loan

Transfers

In

Out 

 Total Income: €18M

Net Income:  €7.3M

Pre-season and friendlies

Competitions

Overview

La Liga

Standings

Results summary

Results by round

Matches
The La Liga schedule was announced on 4 July 2019.

Copa del Rey

Statistics

Appearances and goals
Last updated on the end of the season.

|-
! colspan=14 style=background:#dcdcdc; text-align:center|Goalkeepers

|-
! colspan=14 style=background:#dcdcdc; text-align:center|Defenders

|-
! colspan=14 style=background:#dcdcdc; text-align:center|Midfielders

|-
! colspan=14 style=background:#dcdcdc; text-align:center|Forwards

|-
! colspan=14 style=background:#dcdcdc; text-align:center| Players who have left the club during the season

|}

References
Citations

External links

Deportivo Alavés seasons